Ruha Benjamin is a sociologist and a Professor in the Department of African American Studies at Princeton University. The primary focus of her work is the relationship between innovation and equity, particularly focusing on the intersection of race, justice and technology. Benjamin is the author of numerous publications, including the books People's Science: Bodies and Rights on the Stem Cell Frontier (2013), Race After Technology: Abolitionist Tools for the New Jim Code (2019) and Viral Justice: How We Grow the World We Want (2022).

Benjamin is also a prominent public intellectual, having spoken to audiences across the Americas, Europe, Africa, and Asia, delivering presentations to the United Nations Committee on the Elimination of Racial Discrimination and NAACP Legal Defense and Education Fund, a 2021 AAAS keynote, 2020 ICLR keynote and the 8th Annual Patrusky Lecture.

Benjamin's work has been featured in popular outlets that include, among others, Essence Magazine, LA Times, Washington Post, New York Times, San Francisco Chronicle, The Root, Motherboard, Guardian, Vox, Teen Vogue, National Geographic, STAT, CNN, New Statesman, Slate, Jezebel, Boston Review and The Huffington Post.

Early life 

Benjamin describes her interest in the relationship between science, technology and medicine as being prompted by her early life. She was born in a clinic in Wai, Maharashtra, India. Hearing her parents' stories about the interaction of human bodies with medical technology in the clinic sparked her interest. She has lived and spent time in many different places, including "many Souths": South Central Los Angeles; Conway, South Carolina; Majuro, South Pacific, and Swaziland, Southern Africa, and cites these different experiences and cultures as being influential in her way of looking at the world.

Career 
Benjamin received her Bachelor of Arts in sociology and anthropology from Spelman College, before going on to complete her PhD in sociology at the University of California Berkeley in 2008. She completed a postdoctoral fellowships at UCLA's Institute for Society and Genetics in 2010, before taking a faculty fellowship at the Harvard Kennedy School's Science, Technology, and Society Program. From 2010-2014, Benjamin was Assistant Professor of African American Studies and Sociology at Boston University.

In 2013, Benjamin's first book, People's Science: Bodies and Rights on the Stem Cell Frontier was published by Stanford University Press. In it, she critically investigates how innovation and design often builds upon or reinforces inequalities. In particular, Benjamin investigates how and why scientific, commercial, and popular discourses and practices around genomics have incorporated racial-ethnic and gendered categories. In People's Science, Benjamin also argues for a more inclusive, responsible, and public scientific community.

In 2019, her book, Race After Technology: Abolitionist Tools for the New Jim Code was published by Polity. In it, Benjamin expands upon her previous research and analysis by focusing on a range of ways in which social hierarchies, particularly racism, are embedded in the logical layer of internet-based technologies. She develops her concept of the "New Jim Code," which references Michelle Alexander's work The New Jim Crow, to analyze how seemingly "neutral" algorithms and applications can replicate or worsen racial bias.

Race After Technology won the 2020 Oliver Cox Cromwell Book Prize awarded by the American Sociological Association Section on Race & Ethnic Relations, 2020 Brooklyn Public Library Literary Award for Nonfiction, and Honorable Mention for the 2020 Communication, Information Technologies, and Media Sociology Book Award. It was also selected by Fast Company as one of “8 Books on Technology You Should Read in 2020.”

A review in The Nation noted that, “What’s ultimately distinctive about Race After Technology is that its withering critiques of the present are so galvanizing. The field Benjamin maps is treacherous and phantasmic, full of obstacles and trip wires whose strength lies in their invisibility. But each time she pries open a black box, linking the present to some horrific past, the future feels more open-ended, more mutable…This is perhaps Benjamin’s greatest feat in the book: Her inventive and wide-ranging analyses remind us that as much as we try to purge ourselves from our tools and view them as external to our flaws, they are always extensions of us. As exacting a worldview as that is, it is also inclusive and hopeful.”

In 2019, a book she edited, Captivating Technology: Reimagining Race, Carceral Technoscience, and Liberatory Imagination in Everyday Life was released by Duke University Press, examining how carceral logics shape social life well beyond prisons and police.

Currently, Benjamin is Professor in the Department of African American Studies at Princeton University where her work focuses on dimensions of science, technology, and medicine, race and citizenship, knowledge and power. In 2018, she founded the JUST DATA Lab, a space for activists, technologists and artists to reassess how data can be used for justice. She also serves on the Executive Committees for the Program in Global Health and Health Policy and Center for Digital Humanities at the University of Princeton.

On 25 September 2020, Benjamin was named as one of the 25 members of the "Real Facebook Oversight Board", an independent monitoring group over Facebook.

Honors and awards 
Benjamin is the recipient of numerous awards and fellowships including Marguerite Casey Foundation and Group Health Fund Freedom Scholar Award, fellowship from the American Council of Learned Societies, National Science Foundation, and Institute for Advanced Study, among others. In 2017 she received the President's Award for Distinguished Teaching at Princeton.

Publications 
Benjamin, Ruha (2022). Viral Justice: How We Grow the World We Want. Princeton University Press. ISBN 9780691222882

Benjamin, Ruha (2019). "Assessing Risk, Automating Racism." Science Vol. 366, Issue 6464, pp. 421–422.
Benjamin, Ruha (2018). "Prophets and Profits of Racial Science." Kalfou: A Journal of Comparative and Relational Ethnic Studies Vol. 5, Issue 1: 41–53.
Benjamin, Ruha (2018). "Black Afterlives Matter: Cultivating Kinfulness as Reproductive Justice." In Making Kin Not Population, edited by Adele Clarke and Donna Haraway. Prickly Paradigm Press. (Republished in Boston Review)
Benjamin, Ruha (2017). "Cultura Obscura: Race, Power, and ‘Culture Talk’ in the Health Sciences." American Journal of Law and Medicine, Invited special issue, edited by Bridges, Keel, and Obasogie, Vol. 43, Issue 2-3: 225-238.
Benjamin, Ruha (2016). "Catching Our Breath: Critical Race STS and the Carceral Imagination." Engaging Science, Technology and Society, Vol. 2: 145–156. 
Benjamin, Ruha (2016). "Informed Refusal: Toward a Justice-based Bioethics." Science, Technology, and Human Values, Vol. 4, Issue 6: 967–990. 
Benjamin, Ruha (2016). "Racial Fictions, Biological Facts: Expanding the Sociological Imagination through Speculative Methods." Catalyst: Feminism, Theory, Technoscience Vol. 2, Issue 2: 1-28.
Benjamin, Ruha (2015). "The Emperor’s New Genes: Science, Public Policy, and the Allure of Objectivity." Annals of the American Academy of Political and Social Science, Vol. 661: 130–142.

 "Genetics and Global Public Health: Sickle Cell and Thalassaemia", Simon Dyson and Karl Atkin (eds), Ch11, Organized Ambivalence: When Stem Cell Research & Sickle Cell Disease Converge. (Routledge, 2012)
 "Organized Ambivalence: When Stem Cell Research & Sickle Cell Disease Converge". Ethnicity & Health, 2011 Vol. 16, Issue 4-5: 447–463.
 "A Lab of Their Own: Genomic Sovereignty as Postcolonial Science Policy". Policy & Society 2009 Vol. 28, Issue 4: 3

References

External links 

 
 Introducing the 2020 Freedom Scholars
 2021 AAAS Plenary Lecture
 8th Annual Patrusky Lecture
 ICLR (International Conference on Learning Representations) Keynote 
 Dr. Ruha Benjamin is featured in the documentary focused on Black women, entitled “(In)visible Portraits;” directed by Oge Egbuonu, to debut on OWN Network

Living people
Sociologists of science
Medical sociologists
American women sociologists
American sociologists
People from Satara district
Spelman College alumni
UC Berkeley College of Letters and Science alumni
University of California, Los Angeles alumni
Princeton University faculty
Black studies scholars
1978 births